La Linda International Bridge (also known as the Gerstaker Bridge, Hallie Stillwell Memorial Bridge, Big Bend Crossing Bridge, Puente La Linda, and Heath Crossing is an international bridge which crosses the Rio Grande (Río Bravo del Norte) on the United States–Mexico border in the Big Bend region of Texas. The southern terminus of Ranch to Market Road 2627 in Heath Canyon, it connects Brewster County with the village of La Linda in Acuña Municipality, Coahuila.

History 
The one-lane international bridge was constructed in 1964 by Dow Chemical to transport fluorspar from mines in Coahuila to the United States. The unmonitored international bridge was shut down in 1997 by U.S. and Mexican authorities because of suspected smuggling. According to other reports, the killing of a Mexican customs inspector at the bridge resulted in its closure. A number of individuals have advocated reopening the bridge, citing increased revenue for the area from ecotourism, improved access for those conducting business in both countries, and a need for a crossing based on cultural and familial ties on either side of the border.

In 1998, the National Parks and Conservation Association and the Andrew Kurie and Kurie Family (the owners) were granted a three-year suspension of the U.S. Coast Guard removal order, affirmed by an exchange of diplomatic notes. After the U.S.–Mexico Binational Bridges and Border Crossings Group Meeting in April 2002, a diplomatic note was exchanged between the U.S. and Mexican governments extending the moratorium on the bridge's removal by the U.S. Coast Guard through June 2003. Subsequent notes and negotiations allowed discussion by the U.S. and Mexico to continue. Support for the bridge's reopening from the State of Texas was asserted in HCR 164, enacted and signed by Governor Rick Perry in January 2008.

In 2003, the 78th Texas State Legislature passed a resolution supporting the reopening of the La Linda Bridge, noting that the bridge remained in good condition and local governments in the United States and Mexico supported its reopening as a border crossing.

June 2009 reopening proposal
A proposal for the future of La Linda was introduced at the June 3, 2009 Bridges and Border Crossings meeting in Brownsville. To formalize its proposal, COLINDA secured input from sources including Customs and Border Protection, TxDOT and Coahuila Obras Publicas and Turismo, Big Bend National Park, Comision Nacional de Areas Protegidas, El Carmen conservation groups, secondary schools and colleges in the U.S. and Mexico, Texas Parks and Wildlife, IBWC/CILA, private property owners and the Kurie family.

U.S. permits and Mexican approvals
U.S. presidential permits are not required for bridges built before 1972. La Linda was built and is authorized to operate as a toll facility under Public Law 87-525, Army Corps of Engineers Permit DA-N-005-41-PERMIT-9 dated October 30, 1962. COLINDA’s June 2009 request for the renewal of permits and approvals is being formalized by its attorneys.

References

Buildings and structures in Brewster County, Texas
International bridges in Texas
International bridges in Coahuila
Bridges completed in 1964
Transportation in Brewster County, Texas
Road bridges in Texas
Former toll bridges in Texas
Former toll bridges